Antonio Emery Arocena (26 July 1905 – 29 March 1982) was a Spanish footballer who played as a goalkeeper.

Career
Born in Hondarribia, Emery played for Real Unión.

Personal life
His sons Juan and Román, and grandson Unai, were also footballers.

References

1905 births
1982 deaths
Spanish footballers
Real Unión footballers
La Liga players
Segunda División players
Association football goalkeepers
Emery family